Tempur-Pedic International, Inc., now part of Tempur Sealy International, is a manufacturer and distributor of mattresses and pillows made from viscoelastic foam. The company is headquartered on the Coldstream Research Campus in Lexington, Kentucky and has manufacturing plants in Duffield, Virginia and Albuquerque, New Mexico.

Tempur was originally based on NASA's research to develop a material that would cushion aircraft seats and improve survivability in the event of an accident.

== History ==
The first Tempur-Pedic mattress was introduced by Fagerdala World Foams, a Swedish technical foam firm. The brand was brought to the United States in 1992 and the company Tempur-Pedic, Inc. was founded. Nine distributors of Fagerdala, including Tempur-Pedic, Inc., merged in 1999 to form Tempur World holding company, reformed in 2002 as Tempur-Pedic International Inc. The company went public in 2003. In 2012, Tempur-Pedic and Sealy Corporation announced plans to merge. Tempur-Pedic paid $228.6 million, but the two companies operate separately.

Price fixing settlement
In 2015, Tempur-Pedic's German subsidiary was fined €15.5million by the German Federal Cartel Office for engaging in vertical price fixing between August 2005 and July 2011.

See also
Foam mattress
Foam rubber
Sleep hygiene

References

External links
Tempur-Pedic website
Tempur UK

1992 establishments in Kentucky
Manufacturing companies established in 1992
1999 mergers and acquisitions
2003 initial public offerings
Companies based in Lexington, Kentucky
Companies formerly listed on the New York Stock Exchange
Mattress retailers of the United States